The 2010–11 Supersport Series was a first-class cricket competition held in South Africa from 30 September 2010 to 3 April 2011. Cape Cobras won their second title after defeating Warriors in the final round of matches by seven wickets.

Points table

References

External links
 Series home at ESPN Cricinfo

South African domestic cricket competitions
Supersport Series
2010–11 South African cricket season
Sunfoil Series